Mansonia titillans is a species of mosquito in the family Culicidae.

References

titillans
Articles created by Qbugbot
Insects described in 1848